Francis Rostell "Red" Donahue (January 23, 1873 – August 25, 1913) was an American Major League Baseball pitcher from Waterbury, Connecticut, who played for 13 seasons both in the National League and the American League from  through .

Career
Red broke into the Majors with the New York Giants in 1893, while still attending Villanova University. On July 8, he pitched a no-hitter against the Boston Beaneaters. He lost 35 games during the 1897 season, still an MLB record.

Post-career
Red died in Philadelphia at the age of 40, after succumbing to the effects of paralysis, and was interred at St. Joseph Cemetery in Waterbury, Connecticut.

See also
 List of Major League Baseball career hit batsmen leaders
 List of Major League Baseball no-hitters
 List of St. Louis Cardinals team records

References

External links

 Obit – Red Donahue's Obituary

1873 births
1913 deaths
19th-century baseball players
Major League Baseball pitchers
Baseball players from Connecticut
New York Giants (NL) players
St. Louis Browns (NL) players
Philadelphia Phillies players
St. Louis Browns players
Cleveland Naps players
Detroit Tigers players
Villanova University alumni
Sportspeople from Waterbury, Connecticut
Allentown Kelly's Killers players
Rochester Browns players
Grand Rapids Gold Bugs players